Insides are an English post-rock duo, consisting of members Kirsty Yates (vocals and bass) and Julian Tardo (guitar and programming).

Following the disbandment of their previous band Earwig, Yates and Tardo formed Insides in 1992 and released their debut album, Euphoria, on the 4AD imprint Guernica in November 1993. Euphoria was met with critical acclaim, including being named as one of the year's best albums by Melody Maker. Insides departed 4AD following the release of their second album Clear Skin in 1994 and released their third album Sweet Tip in 2000 on Third Stone Records. The duo disbanded following the album's release and remained inactive for the remainder of the decade.

In a 2011 interview, Tardo indicated that he and Yates were interested in recording new Insides music. The duo returned in July 2016 with the release of a new song, "Ghost Music".

In 2021, Insides issued their first album for two decades when Soft Bonds was released.

Discography

Albums
Euphoria (1993)
Clear Skin (1994)
Sweet Tip (2000)
Soft Bonds (2021)

References

4AD artists
English indie rock groups
English post-rock groups
Dream pop musical groups
Musical groups established in 1992
Musical groups established in 2000
Musical groups reestablished in 2016